The fictional characters from the manga and anime series Blue Exorcist were created by Kazue Kato. The story revolves around Rin Okumura, a teenager who discovers he is the son of the god demon Satan, born from a human woman and the inheritor of Satan's powers. When Rin's guardian dies while fighting Satan, Rin decides to become an exorcist in order to defeat his father. Entering into the True Cross Academy to learn how to fight demons, Rin meets several other exorcist apprentices whom he starts to bond with.  Critical reception to the characters has been positive for their traits and interactions.

Main characters

Rin Okumura
 is the fifteen-year-old protagonist of the story. He is a son of Satan, born from a human woman and is the inheritor of Satan's powers. His powers were sealed at birth into the demon-slaying blade  by Mephisto Pheles, the True Cross Academy principal, allowed him to live a normal human life for nearly 15 years with his twin brother Yukio and his foster father Shiro Fujimoto. Rin becomes aware of his true identity after Kurikara can no longer seal his powers, setting off a chain of events that lead to the death of Shiro at the hands of Satan, who attempts to drag Rin back to the demon realm, Gehenna. Mephisto Pheles later confronts Rin, who demands that Mephisto let him join the exorcists to fight against the demons. Mephisto Pheles—the director of True Cross Academy—personally enrolls Rin into the True Cross Academy so that Rin can pursue his goal to obtain the title of "Meister" in Knight, then become a Paladin and defeat Satan. He also wants to earn Yukio's respect. While currently an Esquire, Rin wishes to obtain the highest rank of an Exorcist, Paladin, to prove Fujimoto did not want to use him as a weapon. Rin is also a good cook, preparing meals for himself and Yukio.

Rin can access the power he has inherited from Satan through drawing Kurikara. The sheath acts as a portal to Gehenna, which, when the blade is drawn, returns Rin to his demon form. While in his human form, Rin exhibits a number of physical traits that are signs of his demonic nature that are intensified in the demon forms. In both forms, Rin can control incredibly destructive bright blue flames, the trademark sign of anything related to Satan. However, when he draws Kurikara, the magnitude of the flames dramatically increases and often leads to Rin being "consumed" by his own flames and losing his mind. Rin later meets a spirit named Kongo Ucchusma who teaches him how to control his flames (in the anime, this was changed to Shura and Yukio who helped him). Rin also has a Cat Sith, Kuro, who was initially Shiro's, as his familiar, and it has 2 tails like a nekomata. When Yukio awakened Satan's power in his eyes and shot him, the demon part of Rin awakens and for a moment takes over his body and nearly kill his friends when he unleash the full power of Satan's flame until Rin takes back control. The resulting awakening caused Rin's appearance to change to similar in appearance with his demonic self. 

Rin is voiced by Nobuhiko Okamoto in Japanese and by Bryce Papenbrook in English, while in VOMIC he is voiced by Daisuke Namikawa.  In the Blue Exorcist musical, he was portrayed by Ryou Kimura.

Yukio Okumura
 is Rin's younger fraternal twin brother. When it was discovered that the woman impregnated by Satan was going to have twins, it was believed that Satan's powers would be split between them. Due to the weakness of Yukio's body, however, he did not inherit any of Satan's power, thus being born fully human with the full extent of Satan's powers going to Rin. Yukio did, however, receive a spirit wound at birth from his brother, which allowed him to be aware of demons for as long as he can remember. Yukio secretly trained to become an Exorcist from the age of seven in order to protect Rin through the help of Fujimoto. While both Yukio and Rin are in their first year at True Cross Academy, Yukio is already an instructor at the Exorcist cram school teaching Anti-Demon Pharmacology to Rin's class.

It is often stated that Yukio is considered a prodigy, having already acquired the title "Meister" in both the Dragoon and Doctor class, while ordinarily most people would aim for Meister in only one class (both are still fully qualified exorcists). He is currently ranked a Middle First class exorcist. Though it is shown that Yukio had once cared for his brother, after beginning to train to become an exorcist to protect Rin, he begins to loathe his brother due to Rin's special treatment as the son of Satan with powers and blames him for their adoptive father's death, which adds to the fire fueling his resentment. However, as the series goes by, Yukio starts to care about his brother like he did before. Fearing Rin will be consumed by his demonic nature, Yukio often berates him for his impulsive actions and reckless attitude. Despite being usually kind, it is shown that he has a somewhat sadistic side that he hides. During the fight against Todo, Yukio discovers he also inherited Satan's flame through his eyes that unconsciously protects him whenever he was near death. The discovery causes Yukio to be obsessed to know the truth behind his and Rin's birth. After reading the file sent by Lightning that contains the Order of True Cross' secret, Yukio came to believe that Shiro never loved him and only raised him to become a living weapon while his brother was loved because he completely inherited Satan's power. His obsession to find out the truth and jealousy towards Rin leads Yukio to join Illuminati.

In the anime, It is changed so that he has the powers of Satan although this is not canon.
He is voiced by Jun Fukuyama in Japanese and by Johnny Yong Bosch in English, while in VOMIC he is voiced by Ryūichi Kijima. In the Blue Exorcist musical, he was portrayed by Kimito Totani.

Exorcists

Shiemi Moriyama
 is the daughter of the woman who runs an Exorcist-only shop. She is kind and has an abiding love of gardening, but often lacks confidence in herself. Before the series, Shiemi never went out of her home and tended to the garden with her grandmother. After her grandmother died, Rin and Yukio exorcise the demon that was leeching her life force and she decides to become an Exorcist.

She is currently an Esquire and with Yukio's help, she later passes the exams to study in the Academy's regular classes as well. Initially, Shiemi scored poorly in tests despite her upbringing, but it was soon discovered that she was using the names that she has created herself. After learning to use official names, Shiemi's grades went up. At first while at the academy, Shiemi only talked with Rin and Yukio, but she eventually comes to amicable terms with Ryuji, Konekomaru, and Renzo. She also earns Izumo's friendship despite being initially used and mistreated by her. Shiemi becomes devastated upon learning Rin's secret, feeling she is not trustworthy enough to them to have initially included her with this knowledge. However, on the Kyoto mission, she reconciles with Rin upon seeing how much he is suffering as a result of his nature. Shiemi has the talent to become a Tamer and can summon a reliable Greenman spirit that can produce healing herbs and plant-related barriers. Shiemi is shown to have great inner strength as she can keep her Greenman around for extended periods without tiring. Her Greenman is able to understand her way of naming plants and is able to produce the correct one when asked.

Shiemi admits that she doesn't really understand the difference between romantic love and friendship due to her isolated childhood and still considers herself too young for love. However, after Yukio left and Rin was nearly killed by his own flame, Shiemi realized that she has been in love with Rin all along. She is voiced by  Kana Hanazawa in Japanese and by Christine Marie Cabanos in English. In the Blue Exorcist musical, she was portrayed by Ari Nakajima.

Ryuji Suguro
 (nicknamed ) is a stubborn and hot-tempered individual. Despite his delinquent appearance and attitude, he is very hardworking and the best student in class. Ryuji is the heir to the Cursed Temple in Kyoto. Because of the destruction of the temple in the Blue Night and his anger towards his father Tatsuma Suguro, he swears he will defeat Satan and rebuild his Temple. When Rin's identity is revealed, Ryuji, along most of his classmates start avoiding him, but after a confrontation with his father and Rin, Ryuji and his classmates help Rin escape impending execution and reconciles with him, claiming that he only blames Rin for not trusting his friends with his secret. During the battle with the Impure King he inherits a familiar named Karura (a phoenix like demon which has the ability to use strong amount of red flames to incinerate almost everything and reincarnate when it dies) from his father Tatsuma Suguro, he uses its power to create a Gouhaen (a fire-element barrier) in order to prevent any miasma coming out from the Impure King from spreading further. Ryuji is currently an Esquire just like Rin and the others, trying to achieve Meister in both Aria and Dragoon. He later becomes Lightning's apprentice, as at this point Bon had lost his direction in life and needed a new path to follow. He is voiced by  Kazuya Nakai in Japanese and by Kyle Hebert in English. In the Blue Exorcist musical, he was portrayed by Yūki Tomotsune.

Renzo Shima
 is a very carefree yet fearful character. He is very loyal to Bon and Konekomaru, since they both grew up with him at the Cursed Temple in Kyoto. Renzo is the second of the cast who accepts Rin after discovering his identity, finding ignoring Rin to be troublesome. He is obsessed with women, and particularly infatuated with Izumo. In elementary school, he was referred to as the "Erotic Demon". Now that he is in high-school, he is trying to be more refined. His hair is naturally black, but he dyed it pink (to the chagrin of his father). Renzo carries a K'rik (Khakkhara) staff to fight like his two brothers and plans to achieve the Meister in Aria. Later in the manga, it is revealed that Renzo has all this time hidden his true abilities as he is capable of summoning high level demons to do his bidding. However, using said summoning really drains him. Revealing himself as an spy for Illuminati, Renzo abandons the Academy and returns to the organization, but later his brother confides to Rin and the others that he is in fact a double agent recruited by Mephisto, eventually returning to his friends' side. Despite he claims that he was on the True Cross' side all along, there is lingering doubts among the members of the order regarding his true loyalty. He is voiced by Kōji Yusa in Japanese and Brian Beacock in English. In the Blue Exorcist musical, he was portrayed by Kazuki Watanabe.

Konekomaru Miwa
 is a timid but brilliant individual, able to come up with complex strategies in a short window of time. He is very loyal to Ryuji and Renzo, as they had grown up together at the same Temple in Kyoto. He is kind to everyone, but it takes a long time for him to reconcile with Rin after discovering his secret, despite seeing his true character. He is an orphan and the surviving head of the Miwa family. He plans to achieve the Meister in Aria. In the anime, a crow demon took advantage of Konekomaru's fear of Rin and possessed him, before Rin is able to save Konekomaru. He is voiced by Yūki Kaji in Japanese and Miki Moran in English. In the Blue Exorcist musical, he was portrayed by Jun Muruyama.

Izumo Kamiki
Hailing from a family of shrine maidens dedicated to the deity Inari,  is easily one of the best students and she is aware of it. She has a tsundere attitude and is offensive towards everyone except her childhood friend Noriko Paku, who was the only one in her elementary school who would talk to her. Very prideful and often difficult to talk to, Izumo does care about her fellow Esquire and is the first of Rin's classmates to accept Rin after his identity as Satan's son was revealed. Izumo attempts to achieve a Meister in Tamer, and can summon two Kitsune (foxes) to fight for her. During the school festival, Izumo is captured by Renzo after he reveals himself as an spy from Illuminati. Izumo's past is also revealed; the kitsune she summons actually lived with her family for generations. Her mother loved Izumo and her sister dearly, but accidentally caused herself to become possessed by the nine-tailed fox when her boyfriend rejected her. Izumo called the Illuminati for help and they took over her shrine for their own nefarious purposes. After realizing that she has been tricked but was powerless to do anything, she reluctantly attends True Cross Academy as an exorcist student to become a new vessel for the nine-tailed fox in exchange Illuminati won't harm her sister. When she was forced to move the nine-tailed fox from her mother into herself, Izumo finally admitted how much she loves the friends she made during her time at the academy and accepted their help. Once she was rescued and found her sister safe but forgot about her, Izumo determines to stop pitying herself and move forward with her life. She is voiced by Eri Kitamura in Japanese and Kira Buckland in English. In the Blue Exorcist musical, she was portrayed by Anna Hachimine.

True Cross Order
The  is the main organization of Exorcists within the series, a global exorcist institution that is controlled by the Vatican. The True Cross Order has roots in Christianity, and was founded by medieval Christian knights. Originally established as a military order, the organization's centuries-long campaign against demons has allowed it to discover and develop new exorcism techniques from all around the globe. As of today, the Order is the largest and most powerful exorcist organization in the world. Given that they have defended mankind from demons for roughly 2000 years, the Order trains exorcists. In addition, the Order takes it upon itself to heal humans who have been harmed by demons, as well as to proactively investigate possible demonic activity. An additional mission of the True Cross Order is to find and destroy human organizations that support demons and demonic activity, such as Demon Eaters or the Illuminati.

Mephisto Pheles
 is the Chairman of True Cross Academy's Japanese branch (using the name, in public). He is portrayed as a man with more money than sense but is very cheap when it comes to spending on others. After Shiro Fujimoto's death, he is ordered to kill Rin but instead accepts Rin's proposal of becoming an Exorcist and enrolled him into True Cross Academy. Mephisto is a powerful exorcist—he is an Honorary Knight (but does not hold a Meister),  and claims that he desires to "bring peace to both Assiah and Gehenna". Despite having served the True Cross for at least two centuries, elements of the Order still consider him suspicious. Their mistrust has its reasons as during the series it is hinted that indeed Mephisto has some secret agenda which involves Rin, working behind the scenes regarding the events around him since he joined the order. Mephisto says Assiah is the best playground for him; he fully enjoys Japanese culture, and proudly admits to Rin that he is an otaku. He owns a large collection of anime and manga-related items, some of which feature characters from Kazue Kato's first manga series, Robo & Usakichi.

Just like Amaimon, Mephisto is a son of Satan, making him Rin and Yukio's half-brother, and one of the "Eight Demon Kings", originally known as Samael, the "King of Time". This is confirmed by how, numerous times in the series, he can be heard chanting "Eins, zwei, drei", which is German for "One, two, three". In Gehenna's hierarchy of Demon Kings he is second only to Lucifer, his older brother and the "King of Light." His ability to transform into a small dog or conjure a giant cuckoo clock are only glimpses of his true powers which allow him to control space and time. Mephisto is suggested to know what will happen, likely due to being King of Time, and has made more than one comment about how he is manipulating the other characters behind the scenes. In a fourth wall break, he tells the readers he believes humans have three desires, which are lust (procreation), greed (financies) and knowledge (curiosity). He is voiced by Hiroshi Kamiya in Japanese and Sam Riegel in English, while in VOMIC he is voiced by Tōru Ōkawa. In the Blue Exorcist musical, he was portrayed by Yūya Nakahara.

His name is derived from Mephistopheles, a demon from the German legend of Faust.

Shiro Fujimoto
 is a Catholic priest at the Southern Cross Monastery, a Paladin in the True Cross Order (the title awarded to the strongest exorcist), Shura Kirigakure's mentor, and foster father to Rin and Yukio Okumura. He was qualified as a Knight, Dragoon, Doctor, Aria and Tamer through his cait sith familiar, which he called Kuro. Shiro is a man dedicated to his duties and was considered the strongest exorcist. Stealing the demon-slaying sword Kurikara, Shiro and Mephisto ultimately used the sword to seal the demon heart of the son of Satan and Yuri Egin. Shiro then adopted Yuri's children, Yukio who did not inherit Satan's power, and Rin, full inheritor of Satan's powers.

It is revealed that Shiro is actually born a clone from the Asylum, a facility that gathered orphans and trained them to become exorcists, with a branch called Section 13 serves as experimentation lab to create a suitable vessel for Lucifer. In Shiro's case, he was a clone of Azazel. Resenting the place, Shiro escaped and met the orphaned Yuri and for a while they stayed together until the Asylum retrieved him together with Yuri who was able to see demons. Desperate for freedom, Shiro strikes a deal with Mephisto to make him exorcist, though even after reaching the rank of Paladin, he was still bound to the Section 13 albeit having more freedom. During this time, he formed a close relationship with Yuri, and even possibly fell in love with her despite having rejected her earlier love confession.

Shiro is thought to be the only man in the world able to sustain possession by Satan himself and thus Satan was constantly after his body. He fights off Satan's attempts at possessing his body through sheer willpower, but after receiving a mental shock from Rin accusing him of "playing father" and not caring, Satan takes over his body. After Satan summons the Gehenna's Gate to retrieve Rin, Shiro regains control of his body temporarily and commits suicide in order to stop Satan. Due to his death, the already tense relationship between Rin and Yukio become worse as Yukio blames Rin for Shiro's death and resents Rin for that. Because of this, Rin decides to avenge Fujimoto by killing Satan with his own hands; he also considers him to be the coolest person he knows. He is voiced by Keiji Fujiwara in Japanese and Kirk Thornton in English, while in VOMIC he is voiced by Yoshito Yasuhara. In the Blue Exorcist musical, he was portrayed by Yasuhiko Imai. In 2017 anime, Shiro is voiced by Hiroaki Hirata.

Shura Kirigakure
 is an Upper First Class Exorcist. She trained under the guidance of Shiro Fujimoto to obtain the title "Meister" in Knight and can draw a demon sword from a symbol above her chest when she states, "Devour the Eight Princesses, slay the Serpent". She dresses revealingly, with bikini tops and shorts. Her sword skills allow her to fight on par with upper level demons like Amaimon. Frequently chipper and obnoxious, Shura is carefree about her job, as she drinks alcohol in excess and oversleeps. She appears to harbor a dark past, as she claims Shiro "came and rescued" her. Its later revealed Shura is cursed by a pact her ancestor made with a snake deity; she will die atrders to investigate the Japanese Branch and eliminate anything she discovered related to Satan. Shura intended to dispose of "her master's mess", Rin, after verifying that Rin was Satan's son, but Rin convinces her he would become a Paladin and prove Shiro was right to let him live. Shura decides to teach Rin how to control his powers in accordance with Shiro's wishes. Later it is revealed that her true mission is to keep an eye on Mephisto, whose real intentions are still shrouded in mystery. She is voiced by Rina Satō in Japanese and Wendee Lee in English.

Igor Neugauss
 is an Upper First Class Exorcist as well as lecturer in the Academy, who obtained the titles of Tamer, Doctor and Aria. He wears an eyepatch over his left eye, and has Aria incantations and magic circles tattooed on both arms. He had a run-in with Satan when he was younger, which robbed him of his family and the sight in his left eye, which is why he holds immense hatred for Satan and demons that are related to Satan. Yet ironically, he is extremely loyal to Mephisto, willing to listen to his every command, which is why he stopped his attacks on Rin prior to the latter becoming an Exorcist.

In the anime, he ends up the suspect for the Masked Man attacks on those allied with Rin; however, the truth is much worse. "Someone" used a demon to bring his wife, Michelle, back to life, and her mental instability at the horrible memory of the Blue Night caused her to attack anything related to Satan, even the friends of his sons. He is voiced by Ryōtarō Okiayu and Patrick Seitz in English.

Arthur Auguste Angel
 is the newly appointed Paladin. He was ordered by the Grigori to interrogate Mephisto and capture Rin as evidence. Arthur is a respected Exorcist with dubious ethics, as said by Shura to be like a saint on the outside but really a devil inside. He uses the sentient demon sword Caliburn. When speaking, Caliburn shows extreme affection towards him and talks like a love-struck teenage girl. Arthur has a great dislike of Rin (simply because of his lineage), being annoyed that the son of Satan destroyed the Impure King. Arthur is a terrible liar, and hinted to be somewhat of an idiot (by Shura) since he always lets Lightning do the thinking for him. In the spin-off, Salaryman Exorcist, it is shown that Arthur has an immense distaste for dirty objects getting near him and draws Caliburn to eliminate the dirt. In the anime, Arthur is replaced by Yukio when Ernst takes over the Vatican. 
He is voiced by Daisuke Ono in Japanese and by David Vincent in English.

Nemu Takara
 is a quiet and mysterious character that carries around a sock puppet. He uses ventriloquism to talk and he is usually rude. Although initially posing as an Esquire, Nemu's powers are revealed to be equivalent to that of an upper first class Exorcist. He is hired by Mephisto as a 'moderator' for the cram students. It's suggested Nemu's puppet is sentient and is actually the one controlling his body, since it was telling Nemu to calm down; adding to this is that Nemu's eyes are usually seen closed, suggesting that he is in a trance. He is voiced by Tsubasa Yonaga in Japanese and by Brianne Siddall in English.

Lewin Light

Other characters

Amaimon
 is the "King of the Earth" and another son of Satan. Among the Eight Demon Kings, he is the seventh in strength. Amaimon has vast control over the land, such as being able to create earthquakes. He is eccentric and hates being laughed at or ignored. Unlike his father and elder brother Mephisto Pheles, Amaimon initially had little interest in Rin, instead wishing to tour Japan upon arrival, but quickly became obsessed with his younger half-brother after fighting him. Amaimon mentions he has a cousin who has an interest in the occult and even goes on to say that he would be happy if he brought him a human eye. After Rin defeats Amaimon in the anime, he turns into a green hamster for the rest of the episodes, running in a hamster wheel located in Mephisto's office. He retains his ability to speak to Mephisto. In the manga, Mephisto Pheles stopped Rin and Amaimon from fighting when Rin went berserk; he is later kept in another dimension, skewered in place by Mephisto until Amaimon's desire to kill Rin cools. Once he promised not to do anything violent for the time being, Amaimon attends True Cross Academy as Mephisto's nephew and is placed in the same class as Shiemi. He has an obsession with sweets, as he is seen with a lollipop in his mouth most of the time. He is voiced by Tetsuya Kakihara in Japanese and Darrel Guilbeau in English. In the Blue Exorcist musical, he was portrayed by Yūki Tamaki.

Saburota Todo
 is a former Upper Second Class exorcist, teacher at the Exorcist Cram School, and Director of the Saishinbu, an area of the True Cross Academy containing dangerous artifacts including Right and Left Eyes of the Impure King. He is sly and skillfully manipulates others to achieve his still-unknown goals. After stealing the Left Eye of the Impure King, he officially left the True Cross Order. He can take control of demons and use their abilities. He seems to be interested in Yukio's development due to him being a son of Satan, and even attempted to convince him to kill Rin. He became hotter by gaining Karura's power. He is voiced by Kazuhiro Yamaji and by Junichi Suwabe in his youth in Japanese and Ray Chase in English.

Satan
 is the main antagonist and the lord of demons who wishes to take control of the humans' world, Assiah. While father to Mephisto Pheles, Amaimon, and Lucifer, he also fathered Rin and Yukio Okumura through their human mother. When Rin awakes his demonic powers inherited from his father, Satan takes control of Rin's guardian, Shiro Fujimoto, in order to encounter and use his son to destroy Assiah. However, Fujimoto's suicide causes him to lose contact with Rin.

Years before the start of the series, Satan was a spirit known as Rinka and has yet to develop an ego. He often played with the child Yuri and kept her company as she grew up until he inadvertently possessed one of the clones created at the Asylum. Using the clone, he went berserk like a child throwing tantrum and would only listen to Yuri. When Shiro defeated him in a game during an attempt to get him to expand his sociality, he began to change, beginning to read books to expand his knowledge of the world and eventually claimed himself to be a god, taking on his current identity as Satan. This belief makes him looking down on other beings and dismiss the value of life. He escaped from Asylum for six months until he finally returned after the clone body he was possessing began to rot. He took over Section 13 to demand new body while delaying his deteriorating vessel through the use of Elixir. This earned him Lucifer's loyalty and allowed Section 13 to continue their experimentation on the Elixir. The Order took this to their advantage to preserve Section 13 under pretext the whole Asylum being taken hostage by Satan. Only until Yuri confronted him and he realized his love for Yuri that Satan decided to abandon Section 13 so he could spend his remaining life with her. Unfortunately, the researchers leaked their plan, allowing the Order to capture the weakened Satan and Yuri. While officially being declared dead, Satan's immobile body was used as lab rat for the order to continue improving Elixir, which eventually led to the Blue Night incident.

In the anime series, Satan once again tries to achieve his plans by using Yukio as his vessel, but Yukio is freed by Rin. He really seemed to care about Rin and Yukio's mother; it was their shared dream to make world where demons and humans lived together in harmony. He meets her spirit at the end of the anime, where she comforts him on his failure by explaining their sons are the first step.  He is voiced by Keiji Fujiwara in Japanese and Kirk Thornton in English, while in VOMIC he is voiced by Atsushi Imaruoka.

Reiji Shiratori
 was the leader of the delinquent gang. He attacks Rin after Astaroth, King of Rot takes over his body. Astaroth was exorcised by Shiro Fujimoto and Reiji hasn't been seen since. Reiji was a delinquent gang leader and likes troubling others. Due to his evilness he was further possessed by Astaroth, the King of Rot. He is very sadistic. In contrast with his delinquent personality, Reiji comes from a rather rich family. Later on, it is revealed that he too attends True Cross Academy as a student. He is voiced by Kentarō Itō in Japanese and Derek Stephen Prince in English.

Tsukumo Kamiki
 is Izumo's little sister. She is four or so when we are introduced to her and about nine years old when we see her after the whole nine-tailed fox mess. After an incident when her mother got possessed by a nine-tailed fox demon, she and Izumo were taken to an Illuminati headquarters. They were told they were there for their "protection" and that the Illuminati was "taking care of their mother". One day Izumo awoke without her sister without beside her as usual. An Illuminati agent named Maria Yoshida said that she had found out they were going to use Tsukumo for experiments, so the night before, Maria had taken Tsukumo to be adopted. She was adopted right away because of her young age. Five years later it is revealed that Maria had not been lying to Izumo, Tsukumo had been adopted by Nemu Takaras' aunt and uncle. Tsukumo was safe from the Illuminati because she had been taken in by people protected by the True Cross Order. Unfortunately, when Izumo approached her sister for the first time in five years, her sister did not remember her.

Yuri Egin
 was the mother of Rin and Yukio Okumura. She was an orphan who was taken by the Order of True Cross to the Asylum where she is trained as an exorcist. She eventually became Lower Second Class Exorcist as a Tamer. Despite her talent, she refused to fight in the frontlines because she loved demons and prefer to work at the Demon Farm. Yuri was well-known and popular amongst her peers, but she only has eyes for Shiro whom despite being outwardly violent, she believed has kindness deep inside him. She professed her love for Shiro and got rejected, but this also softened Shiro's heart who gradually began to socialize well with others. Ever since she was a child, she was accompanied by a spirit Rinka, who later eventually became known as Satan. After Rinka possessed one of the clones created by Section 13, Yuri decided to take care of him since he would only listen to her or else he'll throw a tantrum. Even after Rinka changed and took identity as Satan, Yuri still decided to wait for the day until he return and then save him. When Satan did return after his vessel became to deteriorate, Yuri confronted and convinced him to stop his obsession in getting a new body, promising to stay by his side until he dies. She eventually bore him twin children and they decided to leave Section 13, but their escape was leaked, resulting them being captured by the Order. To cover the existence of Section 13, Yuri was blamed for the entire incident and deemed as a witch for being pregnant with Satan. Despite the consequence, Yuri refused to abort her children, insisting she will protect them.

In the anime, she was a Lower Second Class Exorcist, and about sixteen years ago, bore Satan's children. Her personality was somewhat like Rin's, rebelling against her father's wishes by living in the forest. Despite being an Exorcist, she regarded demons, such as the Goblins and the Snowmen, as her friends. She believed they were curious about life in Assiah and only acted evil because they resented being ostracised by humans. She first encountered Satan on a mission investigating spontaneous combustion. Unlike her companions, Yuri was able to resist being incinerated by Satan's flames. She took pity on him and allowed him to possess her to experience life in Assiah. Not long after, their children Rin and Yukio were conceived. Her own father ordered her to be burned alive after she refused to abort her unborn children. She was saved by Satan and fled back to the woods and gave birth before passing away. Many have claimed that the twins strongly resemble their mother. She is voiced by Megumi Hayashibara in Japanese and Cherami Leigh in English.

Kuro
 is a cat sith and Rin Okumura's familiar, but before he was once the familiar of Shiro Fujimoto until his death at the hands of Satan. He is a black cat with two tails (which is considered to be sacred in ancient Japan) who possesses the abilities of change from a small cat into a nekomata, a giant demon cat with immense strength and power, and the demon telepathy, which allow him to mentally communicate with other demons, including Rin. In ancient times, Kuro used to be the guardian deity of some local silk farmers, until be forgotten by people as the times changed, going berserk, but Fujimoto tamed him and made him his familiar. He soon gained a new role as one of the guardians of the True Cross Academy. After learning of Shiro's death, Kuro lost control and begin attacking the academy, until Rin calm him down, becoming his familiar in the process. He is voiced by Ayahi Takagaki in Japanese and Stephanie Sheh in English.

Lucifer 
 is the one of the 8 demon kings and is half brother to yukio and rin but what we do known is that he is the leader of the illuminati and his plan is to find a perfect vessel for satan so that he can come live assiah and then we see his true intentions is that he want the world full of light so far we do not known what else and his current other plans

Anime-only characters

Ernst Frederik Egin
 is an anime-only, non-canon character. He is Yuri Egin's father and Rin and Yukio's grandfather. He holds a deep hatred against Satan and demons for ruining his life. In the anime only arc, Ernst gave the order to have his daughter, Yuri Egin, executed when he found out that she was pregnant with the children of Satan, indicating that his hatred is unbound by family love. His hatred only grew after the blue night, when he was possessed by Satan, who was trying to save Yuri. Following Yuri's escape, he orders her and her children to be hunted down and destroyed, and believed that they were all killed. He also is against the Grigori's decision to allow Mephisto to belong in the Order, going along with his dislike for demons. After discovering his grandsons are actually alive and working as exorcists, He recruits Yukio (since he believes that he is purely human, whereas Rin has awakened his demonic abilities) as a part of his plan to wipe out all demons. As such, he hates Rin, and even attempts to kill him to open the Gehenna Gate using his blood. He is killed when a vengeful Satan sucks him through the Gehenna Gate he opened. He is voiced by Toshihiko Miki in Japanese and Dave Mallow in English.

Usamaro
 is a young demon Rin meets in the Phantom Train subjugation mission during the events of the movie. He seems to be sealed in a shrine for an unknown reason. He is looked after by Rin during the festival. He is voiced by Rie Kugimiya in Japanese and Cassandra Lee Morris in English

Cheng-Long Liu
 is an Upper First Class Exorcist from the Taiwan branch that is featured in the film. Comes to Japan to help True Cross Academy change a new barrier. From an elite family and has high exorcism skills. He is voiced by Hidenobu Kiuchi in Japanese and Todd Haberkorn in English.

Reception
The characters of Blue Exorcist have been well received by publications for manga and anime with Rin Okumura's receiving most with Danica Davidson from Otaku USA praising his heroic traits despite his demonic nature. Although Carl Kimlinger found that the cast contained several stereotypes found in other series, the delivery from them made the series entertaining first noting the comedy and then fight scenes. In a later review he noted how the secondary characters were given their own episodes to be developed as well other ones where they get closer with Rin. Similar comments were given by Comic Book Bin reviewer Leroy Douresseaux who enjoyed the interaction between the cast, while Chris Beveridge from The Fandom Post noted that while characters' regrouping may feel forced, the revelation of Rin's nature bring multiple reactions to them. The designs by author Kazue Kato were also praised for the way its character is given their distinct traits as well as the changes from Rin when using his demonic powers.

See also
List of Blue Exorcist chapters
List of Blue Exorcist episodes

References
General
Blue Exorcist manga volumes by Kato, Kazue. Original Japanese version published by Shueisha. English translation published by Viz Media.

Other sources

Blue Exorcist